Cantharellus minor is a fungus native to eastern North America. It is one of the smallest of the genus Cantharellus, which includes other edible chanterelles. It is suspected of being mycorrhizal, found in association with oaks and moss. Recently, C. minor has been reported from semi-evergreen to evergreen forests in the Western Ghats, Kerala, India forming ectomycorrhizal associations with tree species like Vateria indica, Diospyros malabarica, Hopea parviflora, and Myristica species. The yellowish gills are decurrent, and fade to yellowish white in maturity. They fruit in the summer and fall. Although insubstantial, they are edible.

References

External links

minor
Fungi described in 1872
Fungi of Asia
Fungi of North America
Edible fungi
Taxa named by Charles Horton Peck